Phanus is a genus of butterflies in the family Hesperiidae, in which it is placed in tribe Entheini.

Species
Phanus albiapicalis Austin, 1993 Mexico
Phanus australis Miller, 1965 Brazil
Phanus confusis Austin, 1993 Mexico
Phanus ecitonorum Austin, 1993 Brazil
Phanus grandis Austin, 1993 Venezuela
Phanus marshalli (Kirby, 1880) Mexico, Trinidad
Phanus obscurior Kaye, 1925
P. obscurior obscurior Trinidad
P. obscurior prestoni  Miller, 1965 Brazil
Phanus rilma Evans, 1952 Mexico
Phanus vitreus (Stoll, [1781]) Mexico, Costa Rica to Suriname, French Guiana

References

Phanus - Natural History Museum Lepidoptera genus database
Funet

Eudaminae
Hesperiidae genera
Taxa named by Jacob Hübner